Michael Edward Duggan (born July 15, 1958) is an American lawyer, businessman, and politician serving as the 75th mayor of Detroit, Michigan since 2014. A member of the Democratic Party, Duggan previously served as the Wayne County Prosecutor from 2001 to 2004, and as the deputy county executive of Wayne County from 1987 to 2001.

Duggan received national attention following his election in 2013, in part for being the first White mayor of the majority-Black city since Roman Gribbs in the early 1970s, when Detroit's population still had a White majority. Duggan was reelected mayor in 2017 and 2021. In 2020, he enjoyed an approval rating of over 68%, the highest approval rating of any mayor of Detroit.

Early life and education
Duggan was born in Detroit on July 15, 1958, to Patrick J. Duggan and Joan Colosimo.  His paternal grandfather was from County Kilkenny, Ireland moving to Detroit at the age of 18, and his paternal grandmother was the child of Irish and German immigrants.  Duggan spent his first six years at a home on Stansbury Street on the city's west side before moving to nearby Livonia in 1963.  He graduated from Detroit Catholic Central High School, and then received a Bachelor of Arts from the University of Michigan in 1980, followed by a Juris Doctor degree from its law school in 1983.

Early career
As a Democrat, Duggan has served as an appointed and an elected official in Wayne County, Michigan, beginning in 1986 as Wayne County's assistant corporation counsel. He was deputy County Executive from 1987 to 2001 under Edward H. McNamara, and was elected prosecutor in 2000.

Beginning in 2004, Duggan was president and CEO of the Detroit Medical Center. He was in this position when the formerly nonprofit DMC was sold to publicly traded Vanguard Health Systems in 2010.

Mayor of Detroit

2013 election campaign

In 2012, Duggan resigned his position at the DMC and moved from the suburb of Livonia to the city of Detroit, intending to run for the office of mayor the following year. However, he failed to qualify for the ballot because he filed less than a year after establishing residency in the city; if he had waited two more weeks to file—which still would have met the filing deadline—he would have qualified.

Instead, he mounted a write-in campaign, and received 52% of the vote in the August primary election. Under Detroit's two-round system, the two highest vote-getters run against one another in the general election, which meant that Duggan ran against second-place finisher Benny Napoleon, who had won 29% of the vote. Duggan ran with the campaign slogan, "Every neighborhood has a future", on a platform of financial turnaround, crime reduction, and economic development. He received 55% of the vote in the general election in November, becoming the first white mayor of the now-majority-black city since Roman Gribbs, who served from 1970 to 1974.

First term
Duggan focused, during his first term, on improvements to emergency services response times and bus services. He also saw a demolition program that was ambitious, but controversial.

Duggan also focused on relighting the city's streetlights, a task in which he saw significant success and built upon efforts initiated by his mayor predecessor Dave Bing.

Duggan had pledged to create a municipally-owned insurance company, dubbed "D Insurance". He advocated hard in 2015 for a bill that would create such a program, but it failed to pass in the Michigan Legislature.

Duggan drastically increased the number of parks that receive regular maintenance, which increased from 25 parks in 2013 to 275 by 2017 per reporting by the mayor's office.

Towards the end of his first term, Duggan established Detroit's first office of sustainability which focuses on creating green, sustainable spaces in Detroit and preparing against climate change affects. The office of sustainability then established Detroit's first Sustainability Action Agenda in June 2019. Joel Howrani Heeres was named as the first Director and remained in the position until August, 2022.

Detroit's unemployment rate by 2017 shrunk down to 7.5%, the lowest it had been since 2000. Duggan worked to create Detroit at Work, an online portal launched in 2017 which connects job seekers with employers and with job training. Duggan also created the "Grow Detroit’s Young Talent" program, a youth summer employment program that employed thousands of youth.

In 2017, the city began issuing Detroit ID, a municipal identification card, which helps enable residents without a social security number to access city services and some banks.

Despite his pledge to quickly reverse the trend, Detroit had continued to see overall depopulation. During his first term, Duggan developed a reputation as a capable technocrat. During his first term, the municipal government's authority was limited by state oversight, with emergency manager Kevyn Orr overseeing the city's bankruptcy and finances.

Second term
In the 2017 Detroit mayoral election, Duggan was re-elected in a landslide, taking 72% of the vote to challenger Coleman Young II's 27%.

In the spring of 2018, the city of Detroit was released from state oversight, giving its municipal government full control over its operations for the first time in four decades.

Duggan encountered a controversy after, in December 2019, the Detroit Office of the Inspector found that three top municipal officials, including his chief of staff Alexis Wiley, had ordered public employees to erase emails having to do with to the nonprofit organization Make Your Date. Michigan Attorney General Dana Nessel launched an investigation into this. In September 2020, Investigative Reporters and Editors awarded Duggan and the city the dubious honor of the "Golden Padlock Award", recognizing them as the most secretive United States agency or individual.

During the COVID-19 pandemic, Duggan was credited with having implemented efforts such as mass testing. In March 2021, Duggan declined to order 6,000 doses of the Johnson & Johnson COVID-19 vaccine, saying that he believed the Pfizer and Moderna vaccines were better options. After backlash, Duggan declared he would no longer decline the vaccine.

Duggan spent much of the last days of his second term managing the city’s rollout of the Covid-19 vaccine. Throughout the early months of 2021, access to the vaccine was expanded in the city. He also addressed concerns about the vaccine from the majority black population of the city. Duggan, when questioned about issues with the vaccine rollout, blamed the failures largely on the federal government. In February 2021, Duggan went to Washington D.C. to meet with other state and local leaders and President Joe Biden to discuss the responses to the pandemic.

In December 2021, Duggan led efforts to demolish the abandoned former American Motors Headquarters building. After being demolished, the land is intended to be used for a redevelopment project to boost the local economy.

Third term 
Duggan was re-elected for a third term in the 2021 Detroit mayoral election.

In March 2022, Duggan gave his state of the city address. His speech addressed several policy topics that he planned to tackle during his term. The first few months of his term also saw Duggan reveal a new proposed city budget which was approved.

Previously, during Duggan's second term as Mayor in 2019 the Detroit Incinerator built in 1989 was shut down. The Incinerator had caused many health problems in neighboring areas and was also a source of air pollution. During the last couple of years in operation its pollution emissions where 750 times higher than the standards. On May 24, 2022 Duggan announced that the Incinerator will be demolished. Homrich will be the company to demolish the Incinerator and state in their proposal that the demolition will lead to a revenue of $1.3 million in salvaged metals and other materials for the Greater Detroit Resource Recovery Authority (GDRRA).

In November 2022, Duggan announced changes to key staff in his administration.

One of the initiatives Duggan is focusing on is affordable housing. Mayor Duggan and other city Council Members developed a $203 million plan to provide affordable housing for Detroit residents. The money got divided between seven services and programs, including homeowner assistance programs, apartment building rehabs, and a Detroit Housing Services division. The goal is to convert vacant apartment buildings into rental housing, expedite the approval process for affordable housing projects, help landlords bring properties into compliance, and more. Duggan believes this plan is "one of the most comprehensive strategies for providing affordable housing." However, the $203 million is not an annual allocation and is only for 2022.

In addition to this plan, the Detroit Housing for the Future Fund (DHFF) aims to preserve existing affordable housing. In January 2022, the fund received a $10 million donation from KeyBank. The goal is to raise $75 million, and with this contribution, the city has reached $65 million of that goal. Just recently, in October, the DHFF completed its second project in Midtown, which involved renovating a historic apartment building. Renovations included upgrading the electric plumbing and replacing the roof.

To further assist Detroit's residents, Duggan's administration has named April Faith-Slaker as the executive director of the city's Office of Eviction Defense. This office is intended to provide residents facing eviction with legal counsel and is set to open on January 3, 2023.

Personal life
Duggan was married to Mary Loretto "Lori" Maher.
In May 2019, Duggan and Maher released a joint statement confirming that they planned to end their marriage. The divorce was finalized on September 17, 2019.  On June 29, 2021, Duggan announced his engagement to Dr. Sonia Hassan.  Duggan and Hassan had been publicly linked prior to his divorce from Maher, and their relationship was the subject of public scrutiny and whether Duggan and the city gave preferential treatment to a program that Hassan led at Wayne State University.

See also
 List of mayors of the 50 largest cities in the United States

References

External links

 Duggan for Detroit campaign site
 About Mayor Duggan
 

1958 births
21st-century American politicians
Living people
American people of Irish descent
American people of German descent
Lawyers from Detroit
Mayors of Detroit
Michigan Democrats
People from Livonia, Michigan
University of Michigan Law School alumni
University of Michigan alumni
American people of Italian descent